Louis Adolphe Coerne (February 27, 1870 – September 11, 1922) was an American composer and music educator.

Life and works
He was born in Newark, New Jersey, and was educated at Harvard University, where he studied under John Knowles Paine, and at the Stuttgart Conservatory, Germany.

He married Adele Turton in 1897.

Coerne wrote a number of pedagogical pieces for piano, and also composed a number of orchestral works, one of which, the tone poem Excalibur, Op. 180, was recorded by Karl Krueger with the Royal Philharmonic Orchestra in the late 1960s, and reissued on CD in 2006 by Bridge Records. His cantata, Hiawatha, Op. 18 was premiered in Munich in 1893 and performed by the Boston Symphony Orchestra in 1894.

Coerne's opera Zenobia, Op. 66, premiered in Bremen, Germany, in 1905, was the first opera by an American composer to be performed in Germany. Earlier that year, Harvard had conferred on Coerne the degree of Ph.D., with the score of Zenobia and his book, The Evolution of Modern Orchestration (published in 1908), serving as his thesis.

Other operas composed by Coerne:

 Bells of Beaujolais (dance directions by J. Lilian Vandevere; text by David Gurden Stevens)
 A Woman of Marblehead, Op. 40
 Sakuntala, Op. 67
 The Maiden Queen, Op. 69

Coerne taught at Smith College, Harvard, and Connecticut College. He died in Boston, Massachusetts.

References

"Coerne and His New Opera", in: New York Times, December 17, 1905.
Coerne, Louis Adolphe: The Evolution of Modern Orchestration (New York: The Macmillan Company, 1908). With introductory note by H.E. Krehbiel.
Sadie, Stanley (ed.): The New Grove Dictionary of Music and Musicians (London: Macmillan, 1980).
Who's Who in America (1912–13).

External links
 
 

1870 births
1922 deaths
American male classical composers
American classical composers
Connecticut College faculty
Harvard University alumni
Harvard University faculty
Musicians from Newark, New Jersey
Smith College faculty
State University of Music and Performing Arts Stuttgart alumni
Classical musicians from New York (state)
Classical musicians from New Jersey